Sylvester Norris (alias Smith and Newton) (1570 or 1572 – 16 March 1630) was an English Roman Catholic controversial writer and missionary priest.

Life
Norris was born in Somerset.  After receiving minor orders at Reims in 1590, Norris went to the Venerable English College, Rome, where he completed his studies and was ordained priest. In May, 1596, he was sent on the English mission, and was one of the appellant clergy in 1600.

In the prosecutions following upon the Gunpowder Plot, Norris was committed to the Bridewell. From his prison he addressed a letter to the Earl of Salisbury, dated 1 December 1605, in which he protests his innocence, and in proof of his loyalty promises to repair to Rome, and labor so that the pope shall bind all the Catholics of England to be just, true, and loyal subjects, and that hostages shall be sent "for the afferminge of those things". As a result, in 1606 he was freed and exiled, along with forty-six other priests, went to Rome, and entered the Society of Jesus.

He was for some time employed in the Jesuit colleges on the Continent, but in 1611 returned to the English mission, and in 1621 was made superior of the Hampshire district, where he died.

Publications
An Antidote, or Treatise of Thirty Controversies; With a large Discourse of the Church (1622);
An Appendix to the Antidote (1621);
The Pseudo-Scripturist (1623);
A true report of the Private Colloquy between M. Smith, alias Norrice, and M. Walker (1624);
The Christian Vow;
Discourse proving that a man who believeth in the Trinity, the Incarnation, etc., and yet believeth not all other inferior Articles, cannot be saved (1625).

References

Attribution

Carlos Sommervogel, Bibl. de la C. de J., V (1808–09)
Henry Foley, Records of the English Province, S.J., VI, 184; III, 301;
George Oliver, Collections towards Illustrating the Biography of S.J., s. v.,
Joseph Gillow, Bibl. Dict. Eng. Cath., V, s. v.

External links

1570s births
1630 deaths
English religious writers
People from Somerset
16th-century English writers
16th-century male writers
17th-century English writers
17th-century English male writers
16th-century English Jesuits
17th-century English Jesuits